The men's 66 kg competition of the 2011 World Judo Championships was held on August 23.

Medalists

Results

Pool A
First round fights

Pool B
First round fights

Pool C
First round fights

Pool D
First round fights

Repechage

Finals

References

External links
 
 Draw

M66
World Judo Championships Men's Half Lightweight